The 2024 elections for the Florida Senate will take place on Tuesday, November 5, 2024, to elect state senators from 20 of 40 districts. The Republican Party has held a Senate majority since 1995.

District 1

Republican primary

Candidates
 Frank White, former state representative

District 3

Republican primary

Candidates
 Corey Simon, incumbent state senator

District 7

Republican primary

Candidates
 Tom Leek, state representative

District 9

Republican primary

Candidates
 Stan McClain, state representative

District 11

Republican primary

Candidates
 Blaise Ingoglia, incumbent state senator

District 15

Democratic primary

Candidates
 Geraldine Thompson, incumbent state senator

District 19

Republican primary

Candidates
 Randy Fine, state representative

District 21

Republican primary

Candidates
 Ed Hooper, incumbent state senator

District 23

Republican primary

Candidates
 Danny Burgess, incumbent state senator from District 20

District 25

Democratic primary

Candidates
 Kristen Arrington, state representative

District 27

Republican primary

Candidates
 Ben Albritton, incumbent state senator and Senate Majority Leader

District 29

Republican primary

Candidates
 Erin Grall, incumbent state senator

District 31

Republican primary

Candidates
 Gayle Harrell, incumbent state senator

District 33

Republican primary

Candidates
 Jonathan Martin, incumbent state senator

District 35

Democratic primary

Candidates
 Barbara Sharief, former mayor of Broward County

District 39

Republican primary

Candidates
 Bryan Avila, incumbent state senator

See also
 2024 Florida elections
 2024 Florida House of Representatives election
 Politics of Florida
 Political party strength in Florida
 Florida Democratic Party
 Republican Party of Florida
 Government of Florida

References

Senate
Florida Senate
Florida Senate elections